High Street station may refer to:

Australia
High Street railway station, New South Wales in Maitland

United States
High Street (IND Eighth Avenue Line) on the New York City Subway

United Kingdom
High Street (Glasgow) railway station in Glasgow, Scotland
Clapham High Street railway station in London, England
High Street Kensington tube station in London, England
Shoreditch High Street railway station in London, England
High Street tram stop, a Metrolink station in Manchester, England
Swansea railway station (formerly called Swansea High Street) in Swansea, Wales
Watford High Street railway station in Watford, England